Andrew Phillips (born 3 July 1991) is a professional Australian rules footballer playing for the Essendon Football Club in the Australian Football League (AFL). He was drafted by the Greater Western Sydney Giants in the 2011 rookie draft, with pick four. He made his debut in round 7, 2012, against  at Manuka Oval, in Greater Western Sydney's first ever AFL win.

In October 2015, Phillips and his other Giants' teammates of Jed Lamb, Lachie Plowman and Liam Sumner were traded to the Carlton Football Club.

Phillips made his Carlton debut in round 1, 2016 against Richmond at the Melbourne Cricket Ground.

Phillips was traded to a third club, at the conclusion of the 2019 AFL season.

References

External links

1991 births
Living people
Greater Western Sydney Giants players
Australian rules footballers from Tasmania
Carlton Football Club players
Preston Football Club (VFA) players
Lauderdale Football Club players
Essendon Football Club players